Dasineura investita, the wood nettle gall midge, forms a  gall that grows on the wood nettle plant Laportea canadensis  It was described in 2016 and is caused by a midge in the family Cecidomyiidae. The galls form on the  petiole, upper leaf, leaf midrib, on leaf veins, between leaf veins, flower, stem. They are oval globose 4-5 mm by 8-12 mm pale, red, white, to green translucent.There are two generations a year, the full grown larva from the autumn generation overwinters in the central chamber of the gall. The genus Dasineura is a vary large one with many gall forming species.

References

External links
gbif 
gallformer

Diptera of North America
Gall-inducing insects
Cecidomyiinae
Insects described in 2016